San Lorenzo is a city in the Central Department in Paraguay. It is a suburb of Asunción, and the third most populous city in Paraguay, with a population of 252,561. The National University of Asunción campus is located in San Lorenzo, that's why it is sometimes known as "Ciudad Universitaria" (University City).  The city is the seat of the Roman Catholic Diocese of San Lorenzo.

History
San Lorenzo was originally a Jesuit ranch dedicated to the exploitations of plantations known as Ñu Guazú, which was erected in the 17th century. In 1767 the Jesuits were expelled from the country, and a town was established on August 10, 1775, by Captain Agustín Fernando de Pinedo.

Location
San Lorenzo is located in the Central Department of Paraguay, about 9km from the capital of the country. It is a part of Gran Asunción. It borders the cities of Luque to the north, Ñemby to the south, Fernando de la Mora to the west, and Capiatá to the east. 

Altitude: 126 meters.
Latitude: 25° 19' 59" S
Longitude: 57° 31' 59" W

Climate
According to the Köppen climate classification, San Lorenzo has a humid subtropical climate (Cfa) with hot summers, warm autumns and springs, and relatively mild winters. The average annual temperature is 30 °C. The coldest month is July and the hottest is January. Rainfall occurs greatly throughout the year; only June and July are semi-dry while the other months are rainy.

Economy
San Lorenzo is the most important city for finances, economics, and education of the Central Department. The main economic activities in San Lorenzo are trade and manufacturing. In the main roads of the city, electronics stores, home-appliance stores, Supermarkets, pawn shops, and real estate stores can be observed. The supplies market is also one of the largest in the nation, with good architecture and the greatest movement in the country. the main Banks, financial companies, and cooperatives are located in and around the main roads as well.

Sports
The most popular sport in the city is football, just like the rest of Paraguay. The main team in the city is Club Sportivo San Lorenzo, who currently play in the Primera División.

Notable residents
Clementino Ocampos (1913–2001), composer
Rudy Torga (1938–2002), actor

References

External links
 

 
1775 establishments in South America
1770s establishments in the Viceroyalty of the Río de la Plata
Populated places established in 1775
Populated places in the Central Department